Deuteromallotus is a Malagasy genus of plants in the family Euphorbiaceae. The genus has 2 species.

References 

Acalypheae
Euphorbiaceae genera